Na Sang-ho (born 12 August 1996) is a South Korean football left winger or forward who plays for FC Seoul and the South Korea national team.

Club career

Youth
He graduated from Kumho High School, which is a youth team of Gwangju FC. He then joined Dankook University's football team.

Gwangju FC
In 2017, Na joined the K League, where he signed with Gwangju FC.

FC Tokyo
In 2019, he joined FC Tokyo.

Seongnam FC
On 8 June 2020, he was loaned to Seongnam FC of K League 1.

FC Seoul
On 9 January 2021 season, he joined FC Seoul.

For the 2022 season, he was appointed as the vice captain of the club.

International career 
He won the gold medal with the South Korea national under-23 football team at the 2018 Asian Games.

Career statistics

Club

International

International goals
Scores and results list South Korea's goal tally first.

Honours

International
South Korea U23
Asian Games: 2018

South Korea
EAFF E-1 Football Championship: 2019

Individual
K League 2 Most Valuable Player: 2018
K League 2 Top goalscorer: 2018
K League 2 Best XI: 2018

References

External links 

 

1996 births
Living people
Dankook University alumni
Association football forwards
South Korean footballers
Expatriate footballers in Japan
South Korean expatriates in Japan
South Korean expatriate footballers
South Korean expatriate sportspeople in Japan
Gwangju FC players
Seongnam FC players
FC Seoul players
FC Tokyo players
K League 1 players
K League 2 players
K League 2 Most Valuable Player Award winners
J1 League players
People from Damyang County
South Korea under-20 international footballers
South Korea under-23 international footballers
Footballers at the 2018 Asian Games
Asian Games medalists in football
Asian Games gold medalists for South Korea
Medalists at the 2018 Asian Games
Sportspeople from South Jeolla Province
2022 FIFA World Cup players